Charles Lynch (judge) (1736-1796) was an American revolutionary who held an irregular court in Virginia to punish Loyalist supporters of the British. Judge Lynch may also refer to:

Charles Francis Lynch (1884–1942), judge of the U.S. District Court for the District of New Jersey
Eugene F. Lynch (born 1931) judge of the U.S. District Court for the Northern District of California
Fionán Lynch (1889–1966), judge of the Circuit Court of Ireland
Frank J. Lynch (1922–1987), judge of the Delaware Court of Common Pleas
Gerard E. Lynch (born 1951), judge of the U.S. Court of Appeals for the Second Circuit
Sir Henry Lynch, 3rd Baronet (died 1691), judge of the High Court of Ireland
Kevin Lynch (judge) (1927–2013), judge of the Supreme Court of Ireland
Matt Lynch (born 1951), judge of the Ohio Court of Appeals
Sandra Lynch (born 1946), judge of the U.S. Court of Appeals for the First Circuit
William Joseph Lynch (1908–1976), judge of the U.S. District Court for the Northern District of Illinois